Patania tenuis is a moth in the family Crambidae. It was described by Warren in 1896. It is found in Australia, where it has been recorded from Queensland.

References

Moths described in 1896
Spilomelinae